Donald is a masculine given name derived from the Gaelic name Dòmhnall. This comes from the Proto-Celtic *Dumno-ualos ("world-ruler" or "world-wielder"). The final -d in Donald is partly derived from a misinterpretation of the Gaelic pronunciation by English speakers, and partly associated with the spelling of similar-sounding Germanic names, such as Ronald. A short form of Donald is Don. Pet forms of Donald include Donnie and Donny. The feminine given name Donella is derived from Donald.

Donald has cognates in other Celtic languages: Modern Irish Dónal (anglicised as Donal and Donall); Scottish Gaelic  Dòmhnall, Domhnull and Dòmhnull; Welsh Dyfnwal and Cumbric Dumnagual. Although the feminine given name Donna is sometimes used as a feminine form of Donald, the names are not etymologically related.

Variations

Kings and noblemen 
Domnall or Domhnall is the name of many ancient and medieval Gaelic kings and noblemen:
 Dyfnwal Hen (Dumnagual I), Ruler of Alt Clut (Strathclyde) (450–475)
 Domnall Brecc, king of Dál Riata (d. 642)
 Domnall mac Áedo, High King of the Northern Uí Néill and Ireland (d. 642)
 Domnall Midi, High King of Clann Cholmáin and Ireland (d. 763)
 Domnall mac Ailpín (812–863)
 Donald II of Scotland (889–900)
 Domnall mac Eimín, Mormaer of Mar (d. 1014)
 Donald III of Scotland (1033–1099)
 Domnall Gerrlámhach, King of Dublin (d. 1135)
 Domnall Ua Lochlainn, High King of Ireland (1083 and 1121)
 Domhnall I, Earl of Mar (1276–1301)
 Domhnall II, Earl of Mar (1305–1332)
 Domhnall, Earl of Lennox (1333–1365)
 Dyfnwal, King of Strathclyde (d. 908×915), also known by the names Donald, Domhnall, and Domnall
 Dyfnwal ab Owain (d. 975), also known by the names Donald and Domnall
 Owain ap Dyfnwal (fl. 934)

Given name

Domhnall 
 Domhnall mac Conchobair Ó Briain (died 1579), Gaelic Irish military leader 
 Domhnall Gleeson (born 1983), Irish actor
Domhnall mac Dáire Mac Bruaideadha (fl. c. 1600), Irish poet 
Domhnall MacAuley (born 1957), Scottish physician and professor
 Dòmhnall Ruadh Chorùna (1887–1967), Scottish Gaelic poet

Donnell 
 Donnell Ballagh O'Cahan (died 1627), Irish landowner and rebel
 Donnell Rawlings (born 1968), comedian

Don 
 Don Adams (1923–2005), American actor, comedian and director
 Don Airey (born 1948), English keyboardist
 Don Ameche (1908–1993), Hollywood actor
 Don Barksdale (1923–1993), American basketball player
 Don Bertoia, Canadian middle-distance runner
 Don Bluth (born 1937), animator, film director, producer, writer, production designer, video game designer and independent studio owner
 Don Bowman (singer) (1937–2013), American comedian, country music singer, and songwriter
 Don Cheadle (born 1964), American actor and producer
 Don Cherry (born 1934), Canadian ice hockey player, coach, and television commentator
 Don Cherry (American football) (born 1994), American football player
 Don Cherry (singer) (1924–2018), American singer and golfer
 Don Cherry (trumpeter) (1936–1995), American jazz trumpeter
 Don Ciccone (1946–2016), American singer-songwriter, member of the band The Critters
 Don Cornelius (1936–2012), American television show host and producer
 Don Cornell (1919–2004), stage name of Luigi Varlaro, American singer
 Dominick Don Costa (1925–1983), American conductor and record producer
 Don Covay (1936–2015), American singer and songwriter
 Don Criqui (born 1950), American sportscaster
 Don Diablo (born 1980), Dutch DJ, record producer, musician and songwriter of electronic music
 Don Digirolamo, American re-recording mixer
 Don Dunstan (1926–1999), South Australian politician
 Don Estelle (1933–2003), British actor and singer
 Don Everly (born 1937), American country-influenced rock and roll singer and guitarist
 Don Felder (born 1947), American singer-songwriter and guitarist, former member of the Eagles
 Don Frye (born 1965), American mixed martial artist and professional wrestler
 Don Garber (born 1957), American sports executive
 Don Gardner (1931–2018), American singer-songwriter
 Don Gibson (1928–2003), American songwriter and country musician
 Don Goldstein, American basketball player
 Don Gorske (born 1953), “Big Mac” Enthusiast and Guinness World Record holder of most Big Macs eaten
 Don Gullett (born 1951), American baseball pitcher
 Don Gullick (1924–2000), Welsh rugby union and rugby league footballer and coach
 Don Hasselbeck (born 1955), American football player
 Don Henley (born 1947), founding member of the Eagles rock group
 Don Herbert (1917–2007), television's "Mr. Wizard"
 Don Hewitt (1922–2009), American television news producer
 Don Ho (1930–2007), American pop musician, singer and entertainer
 Don Hutson (1913–1997), American football player
 Don Imus (1940–2019), American radio and television host
 Don Johnson (sports executive) (1930–2012), Canadian sports executive and president of the Canadian Amateur Hockey Association
 Don King (boxing promoter) (born 1931), American boxing promoter
 Don King (coach) (born 1926), American football player and coach
 Don King (defensive back) (born 1964), American football player
 Don King (defensive lineman) (1929–2014), American football player
 Don King (musician) (born 1954), American singer, songwriter, guitarist, and trumpeter
 Don King (photographer) (born 1960), American photographer, cinematographer, and film director
 Don Roy King (born 1947), American television director
 Don Kirshner (1934–2011), American music publisher, rock music producer, talent manager, and songwriter
 Don Knotts (1924–2006), American actor and comedian
 Don Larsen (1929–2020), American baseball player
 Don Lemon (born 1966), American television personality and current host of CNN Tonight
 Don L. Lind (born 1930), American scientist and a former naval officer and aviator, and NASA astronaut
 Don MacLean (basketball) (born 1970), American basketball player and color commentator
 Don Marion Davis (1917–2020), American child actor
 Don Mattingly, American pro baseball player for the New York Yankees and manager of the LA Dodgers; aka "Donnie Baseball" and "The Hitman"
 Don McLean (born 1945), American singer-songwriter and musician
 Don Nelson (born 1940), American basketball player and coach
 Don Nelson (screenwriter) (1927–2013), American screenwriter, film producer, and jazz musician
 Don Nickles (born 1948), American politician 
 Don Patinkin (1922–1995), Israeli-American economist, and President of the Hebrew University of Jerusalem
 Don Payne, American writer and producer
 Don Quarrie (born 1951), Jamaican sprinter
 Don Reid (born 1945), lead singer of American country group The Statler Brothers
 Don Rickles (1926–2017), American stand-up comedian
 Don Robesky (1906–2002), American football player
 Don Rondo (1930–2011), American singer
 Don Shula (1930–2020), American football coach
 Don Slater (born 1954), British sociologist
 Don Trahan (born 1949), American golfer, father of D. J. Trahan
 Don Van Vliet (1941–2010), American singer, songwriter and musician, also known as Captain Beefheart
 Don Warrington (born 1951), Trinidadian-born British actor
 Don Waterman (born 1950), American racing driver
 Don Webb (American football) (born 1939), American football player
 Don Webb (playwright), English playwright and dramatist
 Don Webb (writer) (born 1960), American science fiction, mystery, and horror writer
 Don Wilson (American football) (born 1961), American football player
 Don Wilson (announcer) (1900–1982), American radio and television announcer and actor
 Don Wilson (Australian footballer) (1914–2015), Australian footballer
 Don Wilson (baseball) (1945–1975), American baseball pitcher
 Don Wilson (cricketer) (1927–2012), English cricketer
 Don Wilson (pastor) (born 1949), American Christian pastor and creationist
 Don E. Wilson (born 1944), American zoologist
 Don M. Wilson III (born 1948), American banker and corporate director
 Don W. Wilson (born 1942), American historian and archivist
 Don Williams (1939–2017), American singer-songwriter
 Don Williams (offensive lineman) (1919–2001), American football player
 Don Williams (American football coach) (1927–2013), American football, track and field coach
 Don Williams (footballer, born 1935) (1935–1995), Australian rules footballer
 Don Williams (footballer, born 1939) (born 1939), Australian rules footballer
 Don Williams (poker player) (1942–2013), American poker player
 Don Williams (racing driver) (1947–1989), American racing driver

Donal 
 Donal Logue (born 1969), Canadian actor
 Donal MacIntyre (born 1966), Irish investigative reporter
 Donal Murray (bishop) (born 1940), the Roman Catholic Bishop of Limerick (1996–2009)
 Donal O'Brien (disambiguation), several individuals
 Donal O'Donoghue (1894–1971), Irish Fianna Fáil politician
 Donal O'Shea, Canadian mathematician
 Donal O'Sullivan (disambiguation), several individuals
 Donal Roe MacCarthy Mór (died 1302), 13th-century noble of Ireland, Prince of the Kingdom of Desmond
 Donal MacCarthy Reagh (1450/1460–1531), 9th Prince of Carbery (1505–1531)
 Donal Skehan (born 1986), Irish singer, television personality/presenter, food writer/cook and photographer

Dónal 
 Dónal Lunny (born 1947), Irish folk musician
Donal Óg Cusack (born 1977), Irish hurler

Donald 
 Donald Bailey (1934–2013), American jazz drummer
 Donald Bradman (1908–2001), Australian cricketer
 Donald Brashear, American ice hockey player
 Donald Burgess, British track cyclist
 Donald Byrd (1932–2013), American jazz and rhythm and blues trumpeter
 Donald Cameron (born 1954), Australian water polo player and coach
 Donald Campbell (1921–1967), British world land and water speed record breaker
 Donald M. Campbell Jr. (born 1955), retired United States Army lieutenant general who served as the commanding general of United States Army Europe
 Donald Capelle, Marshallese politician
 Donald Chumley (born 1962), American football player
 Donald Crisp (1882–1974), filmmaker
 Donald D. Deshler, American educator
 Donald Dewar (1937–2000), Labour Party MP and first First Minister of Scotland (1999–2000)
 Donald Disney, Fellow of the Institute of Electrical and Electronics Engineers
 Donald Driver, NFL player for the Green Bay Packers
 Donald "Duck" Dunn (1941–2012), American bass guitarist
 Donald Fagen (born 1948), American musician
 Donald Faison (born 1974), American actor and comedian
 Donald Foss (born 1945), American billionaire, founder of Credit Acceptance
 Donald Friese (born 1940), American billionaire businessman
 Donald Henry Gaskins (1933–1991), American cannibalistic serial killer, rapist, and thief
 Donald Geisler (born 1978), Filipino taekwondo athlete
 Donald Glover (born 1983), American actor, musician, writer, comedian, and producer
 Donald Gordon (cricketer) (born 1990), English cricketer
 Donald J. Guter (born 1948), American educator and 37th Judge Advocate General of the Navy
 Donald Hawkins (born 1992), American football player
 Donald Harvey (1952–2017), prolific American serial killer
 Donald Hewagama (1926–2009), Sri Lankan Sinhala Judge Advocate General, Sri Lanka Army
 Donald Hewlett (1922–2011), British actor
 Donald Izacus Panjaitan (1925–1965), Indonesian general
 Donald Izzett (born 1975), American man who has been missing since 1995
 Donald Edward Jones (born 1949), American politician
 Donald Keene (1922–2019), American-Japanese literary scholar
 Donald Knuth (born 1938), American computer scientist
 Donald Maclean (spy) (1913–1983), British diplomat and Soviet spy
 Donald MacCormick (1939–2009), Scottish journalist
 Donald R. MacLeod, Canadian politician
 Donald R. McMonagle (born 1952), former astronaut and a veteran of three shuttle flights
 Donald Moatshe (born 1985), South African musician
 Donald Mote (1900–1968), Justice of the Indiana Supreme Court
 Donald "Don" Muraco (born 1939), American retired wrestler
 Donald Nicol (1843–1903), Scottish politician
 Donald Nicolaisen, American politician
 Donald Nixon (1914–1987), younger brother of 37th U.S. President Richard Nixon
 Donald Obeyesekere (1888-1964), Sri Lankan Sinhala legislator
 Donald of Ogilvy (Saint Donald)
 Donald Parham (born 1997), American football player
 Donald Perera, 11th Commander of the Sri Lanka Air Force
 Donald H. Peterson (1933–2018), United States Air Force officer and NASA astronaut
 Donald Pettit (born 1955), American chemical engineer and a NASA astronaut
 Donald Pleasence (1919–1995), English actor
 Donald Ramotar, President of Guyana
 Donald Jasen Ranaweera, Sri Lankan Sinhala planter, press baron, and politician
 Donald Ray "Don" Vaughan (born 1952), North Carolina, US, politician
 Donald Richie (1924–2013), American-born author who wrote about the Japanese people, the culture of Japan, and especially Japanese cinema
 Donald A. Ritchie (born December 23, 1945), Historian Emeritus of the United States Senate
 Donald "Buck Dharma" Roeser (born 1947), rock musician, guitarist for Blue Öyster Cult
 Donald Rumsfeld (1932–2021), United States Secretary of Defense
 Donald Sanford (born 1987), American-Israeli Olympic sprinter
 Donald Sild (born 1968), Estonian javelin thrower
 Donald "Deke" Slayton (1924–1993), American astronaut
 Donald Spero, world champion rower
 Donald Sterling, sports team owner
 Donald Sutherland (born 1935), Canadian actor
 Donald A. Thomas (born 1955), American engineer and a former NASA astronaut
 Donald J. Trahan, Jr. (born 1980), American golfer
 Donald Triplett (born 1933), first person to be diagnosed with autism
 Donald Trump (born 1946), 45th President of the United States, businessman
 Donald Tsang (born 1944), Chief Executive of Hong Kong
 Donald Tusk (born 1957), former President of the European Council, former Polish Prime Minister (2007–14)
 Donald Wailan-Walalangi (born 1960), Indonesian tennis player
 Donald Watson (1910–2005), English animal rights advocate and founder of the Vegan Society
 Donald Woodward Lee (1910–1977), American philologist
 Donald Whiston (1927–2020), American ice hockey player
 Donald Whitton, Canadian cellist and teacher
 Donald E. Williams (1942–2016), American naval officer and aviator, test pilot, mechanical engineer and NASA astronaut
 Donald Williamson (disambiguation), multiple people
 Donald Wilson (disambiguation), multiple people
 Donald Young (tennis) (born 1989), American tennis player

Donaldo 
 Donaldo Arza (born 1946), Panamanian track and field athlete
 Donaldo González (born 1971), Panamanian footballer
 Donaldo Hontiveros (born 1977), Filipino basketball player
 Donaldo Macedo (born 1950), American academic
 Donaldo Méndez (born 1978), Venezuelan baseball player
 Donaldo Morales (born 1982), Honduran footballer
 Donaldo Ortiz Colín (born 1961), Mexican politician
 Donaldo Ernesto Reyes (born 1939), Honduran lawyer and politician

Donnie 
Donnie McKinnon (born 1940), Scottish footballer
 Donnie Wahlberg (born 1969), American singer, actor and film producer

Donny 
 Donny Hathaway (1945–1979), American soul musician
 Donny Osmond (born 1957), American singer and actor

Fictional 
 Donald Blake (Marvel Comics), the secret identity of The Mighty Thor, from Marvel Comics
 Donald Duck, Disney animated cartoon and comic-book character
 Donnie Darko, protagonist of a film of the same name
 Donald "Don" Draper, protagonist of the AMC television series Mad Men
 Donald "Ducky" Mallard, character in the TV show NCIS
 Donald Fisher, fictional character portrayed by Norman Coburn in Home and Away
Donald Morden, fictional character from the video game series Metal Slug
 Sir Donald McDuck, Disney character who is an ancestor of Scrooge McDuck and Donald Duck
 Donald the Twin Engine, a fictional character from The Railway Series and its televised adaptation Thomas & Friends

See also 
 List of Irish-language given names
 List of Scottish Gaelic given names
 Clan Donald, one of the largest Scottish clans
 Donald (surname)
 Dumnorix
 Macdonald (name)

References 

English-language masculine given names
English masculine given names
Scottish masculine given names